Aroma Rural LLG is a local-level government (LLG) of Central Province, Papua New Guinea.

Wards
01. Paramana
02. Pelagai
03. Maopa
04. Gaivakalana
05. Egala Auna
06. Waro/Iruone
07. Kwapeupa Kelekapana
08. Wairavanua
09. Vuru
10. Kelerakwa
11. Bukuku
12. Upulima
13. Waiori
14. Wanigela
15. Gavuone
16. Kapari
17. Lalaura
84. Kupiano Urban

References

Local-level governments of Central Province (Papua New Guinea)